Ian Brune (29 October 1949 – 20 July 2014) was a South African cricketer. He played one first-class match for Orange Free State in 1968/69.

References

External links
 

1949 births
2014 deaths
South African cricketers
Free State cricketers
People from Mufulira